Westwater Resources, Inc. (WWR), is an explorer and developer of US-based mineral resources essential to clean energy production. The company has operated some uranium facilities in the past, however they have recently been exploring lithium and graphite, anticipating a rise in demand of battery related materials due to accelerating electric vehicle production.

Company history

In 1977, the company was founded in Southern Texas solely operating in uranium.

In 2003, the company proposed to mine in traditional Navajo territory. In 2012, the EPA was considering a permit for the Church Rock mine, which had a large uranium spill contaminating the Puerco River and washing downstream to the Navajo Nation in 1979 when it was owned by the United Nuclear Corporation. An online petition received over 15,000 supporters standing against the re-permitting of the Church Rock mine. On April 8, 2016, the company sold its subsidiary, Hydro Resources, Inc. (which holds the Church Rock and Crownpoint uranium properties in New Mexico) to Laramide Resources, Ltd.

In August 2012, the company merged with Neutron Energy, Inc.

In August 2017, the company changed its name from Uranium Resources to Westwater Resources, Inc. The company previously traded under the ticker symbol URRE.

Westwater Resources acquired Alabama Graphite Corp. in April 2018.

Uranium

The company owns uranium properties in South Texas, where they have two licensed in-situ recovery processing facilities: Kingsville Dome near Kingsville, Texas and Rosita. The mineral properties in New Mexico have not undergone development. It's estimated that the mineral claims in New Mexico contains more than one hundred million pounds U3O8 of in-place mineralised uranium material.

In 1985, the United States Department of Energy's contracts for the purchase of uranium thrown out by a United States district court, in favor of the company.

Production ceased in 2009 after the fall of uranium prices, and has remained idled following the wake of the April 2011 Fukushima earthquake. However, with 50 nuclear reactors currently under construction worldwide, a sustained rise in uranium prices could make these facilities economically viable in the future.

Since 2007, Westwater Resources has invested in the exploration and development of its uranium projects in Turkey, namely in Temrezli and Sefaatli. Unfortunately, the government of Turkey is upholding that all permits granted to the company for Uranium exploration were "issued by mistake." Experts have estimated that the Temrezli mine alone would generate revenues of up to $644 million over its life, resulting in a net ROI of $267 million. However, after repeated attempts to make contact with the Turkish government, the company filed a request for arbitration with the International Centre for Settlement of Investment Disputes (ICSID) as a result of Turkey's unlawful actions. Their request was registered, and as of May 1, 2019, a three-member ICSID panel was formed. The proceedings will take place in Washington, DC. On Monday, January 27, 2020, Westwater, the claimant, filed a Memorial on the merits of their case to the panel. The Republic of Turkey must move to bifurcate the proceedings by March 9, 2020, or alternatively, file a counter-Memorial by June 15, 2020. The first hearing will be sometime between March and September, in 2021, depending on how the case progresses.

Lithium

In 2016, the company was able to obtain over 30,000 acres of lithium brine properties, including the Sal Rica Project in Utah and the Columbus Salt Marsh (or Columbus Basin) project in Nevada (near Tesla's Gigafactory). Values ranging from 60 to 170 ppm were common across all three properties, although some anomaly-type samples indicated up to 392 parts per million of lithium concentrations. However, the company currently only has mineral and water rights for their Columbus Basin project (14,220 acres).

In 2020, the company decided to focus all of its resources on the development of its graphite business and returned its lithium claims in Nevada and Utah to the United States government.

Graphite

In early to mid 2018, Westwater Resources completed the acquisition of Alabama Graphite. Part of that acquisition included the Coosa Graphite Project, held under a long-term lease. It lies about 25 miles southwest of Sylacauga, Alabama and covers 41,900 acres of land at the southern end of the Appalachian mountain range. As of September 2018, Westwater successfully produced approximately 4 kg of battery grade graphite. Since then, Westwater has received a request for from an undisclosed battery manufacturer for one tonne of purified micronized graphite for further testing. To meet this request, as well as any others that may come in the future, the Company has decided to outsource their natural flake graphite until Westwater's Coosa Graphite Mine is permitted and operational. 

The Company anticipates a full scale mining rate of 577,000 short tons per year, at an average grade of 3.2% graphite. Westwater plans to use bulldozers, excavators, loading equipment, and 45-ton haul trucks to bring the material to the processing plant, by which point they will have replaced the outsourced graphite supply with their own. Once at the processing plant, the metallurgical process of flotation processing will be employed to remove impurities, without damaging the graphite flakes. From there, the graphite will go through multiple rod and ball mill grinders as well as additional flotation units. 

As for turning the natural flake graphite into a battery-ready product, Westwater Resources has turned Dorfner Anzaplan (based in Hirschau, Germany) to define the method, equipment, and operating parameters for graphite purification to the 99.95% threshold. 

One potentially lucrative aspect of the Coosa Graphite project is that that graphite has been declared a critical strategic mineral by the Department of Defense contractors. Whenever possible, the US military is legally required to use US sourced materials. Therefore, the company has a strong chance of attracting those contractors as customers.

References

Lithium mining
Uranium mining companies of the United States
Companies based in Colorado
Energy companies established in 1977
Non-renewable resource companies established in 1977
Companies listed on the Nasdaq